Imarat Stadium, opened in 1952, was a multi-purpose stadium in Aghdam, Azerbaijan. The stadium was built in 1952 and used as home stadium by Qarabağ FK. The stadium was destroyed by bombardments from Armenian military forces during the First Nagorno-Karabakh War in June 1993.

The stadium returned to Azerbaijani control on 20 November 2020 as a result of the 2020 Nagorno-Karabakh war. Following its capture, Azerbaijani forces began to clear mines from the stadium grounds. The Ministry of Youth and Sports of Azerbaijan has declared that the stadium will be restored.

The biggest fan club of the Qarabağ FK, Imarat Tayfa, was also named after this stadium.

References 

Defunct football venues in Azerbaijan
Qarabağ FK